JLA: Shogun of Steel (2002) was a prestige format comic book one-shot from DC's Elseworlds imprint. It was written by Ben Raab, with art by Justiniano.

Plot

A rocketship from an exploding planet Krypton lands not in Smallville, but rather war-torn 14th century feudal Japan. When the baby from Krypton grows into a man, Hoshi, he is convinced by a ragtag band of warriors - Elseworlds versions of the Flash, Hawkman, and Batgirl, among others - to join a rebellion against the oppressive and cunning "Shogun of Steel".

References

Elseworlds titles
One-shot comic titles
Justice League titles
Comics set in Japan
Japan in non-Japanese culture